Kristeen von Hagen (born in Victoria, British Columbia) is a Canadian/American comedian, writer and actress. She is currently the opening comedian for the Las Vegas residency of Puppetry of the Penis 

Kristeen is a 4 time Canadian Comedy Award winner and has been seen on the Just for Laughs Festival, Winnipeg Comedy Festival, Showtime's Comedy without Borders as well as 2 Comedy Now! CTV Specials. 

As a writer and producer Kristeen has won 4 Canadian Screen Awards. Her recent writing credits include the Juno Awards, Stronger Together, Canada Day and Canada's Walk of Fame.

. Von Hagen has won Best Female Stand-up of at the Canadian Comedy Awards twice. She appears in the NFB documentary on aspiring comics, The Next Big Thing.

References

External links

Official website

1976 births
Actresses from Victoria, British Columbia
Canadian television actresses
Canadian women comedians
Living people
Canadian Comedy Award winners